Blue is the seventh studio album by The Mission. It was released in June 1996 on Equator Records (UK) and Dragnet/Sony (Germany). It reached #72 on the UK Albums Chart and #11 on the UK Independent Albums Chart. The single "Coming Home" appeared in Germany only.

Background 
Contractually obliged to record another album Wayne Hussey began to demo songs for the sixth regular studio album in December 1995. He rented a small apartment in the city of Bath where the bulk of the material was written. Unlike previous occasions, a set period of recording was set aside and the band had strictly two weeks of recording scheduled. With the sessions concluded Hussey travelled to New York City where he compiled the album together with Mark Saunders. The song "Evermore and Again" is a re-recording of "Forevermore" a B-side of the "Beyond the Pale" single. During the subsequent 'Tour '96' Hussey announced that the band was to be dissolved. The album was re-released in 2011 with two bonus tracks "Perfect Sunrise" and "Coming Home (God-like version)".

Track listing
 "Coming Home" - 2:47
 "Get Back to You" - 4:27
 "Drown In Blue" - 4:38
 "Damaged" - 4:50
 "More Than This" - 4:39
 "That Tears Shall Drown the Wind" - 5:23
 "Black & Blue" - 2:07
 "Bang Bang" - 4:18
 "Alpha Man" - 4:33
 "Cannibal" - 4:15
 "Dying Room" - 3:54
 "Evermore and Again" - 5:34

References

1996 albums
The Mission (band) albums